Devery Vaughn Henderson Jr. (born March 26, 1982) is a former American football wide receiver who spent 9 seasons with the New Orleans Saints of the National Football League (NFL).  The Louisiana-born Henderson played for Louisiana State University (LSU) where he and the Tigers won the 2004 BCS National Championship Game for the 2003 NCAA Division I-A football season. A few months later, the New Orleans Saints selected Henderson in the second round of the 2004 NFL Draft.

Henderson was part of the Saints' 2009 team that won Super Bowl XLIV against the Indianapolis Colts.

Early years
Henderson grew up in Opelousas, Louisiana, and attended Opelousas High School where he was a star for their highly rated track team. He attended LSU on a track and football scholarship.

College career
The highlight of his career at LSU came on November 9, 2002. Henderson caught the famed "Bluegrass Miracle" deep pass from Marcus Randall to help defeat the Kentucky Wildcats, 33–30. This play was also especially noteworthy as the Kentucky coach Guy Morriss had already received the famed "Gatorade shower" prior to the touchdown.  The "Bluegrass Miracle" also won an ESPY award the following year for "Best Play."  Henderson accepted the award on behalf of the LSU Tigers.

In 2002, Henderson recorded 23 catches for 447 yards with 8 touchdowns, carving out a role as a deep threat. Henderson was part of LSU's 2003 BCS National Championship team during his senior season. That year, he was named on the All-SEC Second-team after racking up 11 touchdowns and 861 yards on 53 receptions.

Henderson was also a track star at Louisiana State University, where he was member of LSU's national champion track, member of LSU's NCAA-qualifying 4 × 100 metres relay team and also a member of LSU's 2001 National Champion Indoor Track and Field team. In his sophomore season, he ran the second-fastest 60-meter time in school history, with a time of 6.72 seconds.

Professional career

2004 NFL Combine

New Orleans Saints

Henderson was drafted by the New Orleans Saints in the second round with the 50th pick of the 2004 NFL Draft.

Henderson benefited from the regime change in New Orleans after his rookie year, as the 2006 season saw Aaron Brooks give way to Drew Brees at quarterback and Sean Payton replace Jim Haslett as head coach. His statistics improved over those of his rookie season — most notably in receptions (22 vs. 32), total yards (343 vs. 745), yards per catch (15.6 vs. 23.3), longest catch (66 vs. 76), and touchdowns (3 vs. 5).

On November 5, 2006, Devery had his best day as a professional in a game against the Tampa Bay Buccaneers, catching 3 passes for 111 yards and 2 touchdowns. Henderson had 158 receiving yards on 5 catches, including a 76-yard touchdown, against the Atlanta Falcons on November 26, 2006. On December 10, 2006, Henderson caught two passes from Drew Brees for 92 yards and one touchdown, as the Saints defeated the Dallas Cowboys 42–17 on NBC Sunday Night Football.

On March 2, 2009, Henderson re-signed with the Saints. The Saints went to the Super Bowl that year and Henderson had 7 catches for 63 yards en route to the Saints defeating the Indianapolis Colts in Super Bowl XLIV.

On September 18, 2011, Henderson had a touchdown catch for 79 yards. On October 8, 2012, he caught a touchdown pass from Drew Brees to break Johnny Unitas's record of 47 straight games with a touchdown pass in the Saints' 31-24 win over the San Diego Chargers.

As of Week 17 of the 2012 NFL Season, Henderson averages nearly 18 yards per catch (17.9625), which is the highest among all active receivers for yards per catch with 200+ catches.

After the Saints' 2012 season, Henderson became a free agent.

As of 2019 he is still the #6 All-Time career Receiving Yards Leader in Saints Franchise History with 4377 yards.

Washington Redskins
Henderson signed with the Washington Redskins on June 12, 2013. He was released by the team on August 14, 2013.

NFL career statistics

References

External links
LSU Tigers bio
New Orleans Saints bio

1982 births
Living people
Sportspeople from Lafayette, Louisiana
Players of American football from Louisiana
African-American players of American football
American football wide receivers
LSU Tigers football players
New Orleans Saints players
Washington Redskins players
21st-century African-American sportspeople
20th-century African-American people